The 1st Army Brigade is a mixed (mechanized infantry and armoured) brigade of the Serbian Army.

History 
The brigade was formed on July 31, 2006, from units located in Vojvodina and Mačva: Novi Sad Corps and parts of the 1st Armoured Brigade as well as 402nd and 485th Pontoon Battalion. In 2007 brigade was again reorganized, with 110th and 111th Poonton Battalion being subordinated to the Serbian River Flotilla.

Structure
Brigade's units are spread out throughout the territory of northern Serbia, mostly Vojvodina and Mačva, from the border with Hungary on north to Croatia and Romania on west and east, to western Serbia to the south. It consists of mechanized infantry, armoured, artillery, air defence artillery, engineer, signal and logistics units.

10th Command Battalion - Novi Sad
11th Infantry Battalion - Pančevo
111th Infantry Battalion - Loznica
12th Self-propelled Artillery Battalion - Bačka Topola
13th Self-propelled Multiple Rocket Launcher Artillery Battalion - Sremska Mitrovica
14th Air-defence Artillery Battalion - Pančevo
15th Tank Battalion - Sremska Mitrovica
16th Mechanized Battalion - Sremska Mitrovica
17th Mechanized Battalion - Bačka Topola
18th Engineer Battalion - Novi Sad
19th Logistics Battalion - Novi Sad

Equipment
M-84 main battle tank
BVP M-80 infantry fighting vehicle
BTR-50 command armoured personnel carrier
BRDM-2 armoured reconnaissance vehicle
2S1 Gvozdika 122mm self-propelled howitzer
M-77 Oganj 128mm self-propelled multiple rocket launcher
PASARS-16 short-range surface-to-air missile system
Strela 10 short-range surface-to-air missile system
Bofors L/70 40mm anti-aircraft gun
engineer and logistics vehicles and equipment

Traditions

Anniversary
The anniversary of the unit is celebrated on November 9. On that date in 1918 7th Infantry Regiment of the Royal Serbian Army has liberated Novi Sad in World War I.

Patron saint
The unit's slava or its patron saint is Saint Nestor.

References

External links
 1st Army Brigade Web Page

Brigades of Serbia
Military units and formations established in 2006